Plum Creek Timber Company, Inc. was a timberland owner and manager, as well as a forest products, mineral extraction, and property development company, until it merged with Weyerhaeuser Company. It was headquartered in Suite 3100 at 601 Union Street in Seattle.

Plum Creek was spun off from Burlington Resources as a master limited partnership (MLP) on June 8, 1989. Burlington Resources was created from the Burlington Northern railroad's natural resources holdings in 1988. The MLP converted to a real estate investment trust on July 1, 1999, in order to obtain tax and accounting advantages available to real estate developers.

Plum Creek Timber produces a line of softwood lumber products, including common and select boards, studs, edge-glued boards, and finger-jointed studs. These products are targeted to domestic lumber retailers, such as retail home centers, for use in repair and remodeling projects. These products are also sold to stocking distributors for use in home construction. The company also does mineral extraction, natural gas production, and deals with communication and transportation rights of way.

On November 8, 2015, it was announced that Plum Creek would be bought by Seattle-based Weyerhaeuser for $8.4 billion, forming the largest private owner of timberland in the United States.  The transaction closed on February 19, 2016.

Transactions with the U.S. Federal Government

Plum Creek had warned the U.S. Government that it would log the land should the deal not go through. The federal government also had to pay $4.3 million as part of the deal.

In 2008, Senator Max Baucus arranged for appropriations in the 2008 Farm Bill to be used to purchase  of Plum Creek land in Montana.  This project became known as the Montana Legacy Project.

Environmental record
There is some controversy over the management of Plum Creek's timberland, mostly from environmental groups who decry the recent move from Plum Creek as a timber management company into a developer of its land, taking advantage of the much more profitable land values that have occurred for undeveloped land in the late 1990s until the crash in real estate prices. Plum Creek is engaged in a proposal for a large resort and development tract in the Northern Maine Woods, on Moosehead Lake by Greenville, Maine, one of the largest undeveloped forests east of the Mississippi River.

This follows on the heels of their development of managed land in Washington state (Suncadia) and Montana (Moonlight Basin, Yellowstone Club) into costly resorts, bringing golf courses and luxury housing into the deep forests. The debate pits conservation groups trying to balance recreation and protection, and the effects of sprawl and overdevelopment upon wildlife, quality of life, and the employment of local populations who depend in part on the hunting, fishing and tourist trades which may be damaged by the overdevelopment of the area.

Plum Creek states that they follow three principles, Replanting, Protecting Water Quality, and Managing Wildlife Habitat. Every year Plum Creek replants approximately 85 million seedlings and plans for the natural regeneration of millions of trees.

In 2001, Plum Creek at their Medium Density Fiberboard facility completed the installation of a biofilter, a new air emission treatment technology. This technology uses naturally occurring bacteria to destroy air pollutants that are generated in the wood fiber drying and pressing processes. The technology does not burn natural gas like most treatment systems do to destroy pollutants.

They are also currently working on a Plum Creek Moosehead development. According to an environmental group, the Native Forest Network (NFN), if approved by the Land Use Regulation Commission, Plum Creek's plan would increase Maine's total carbon emissions by nearly 8%.

References

External links
Plum Creek Timber Legacy Info at weyerhaeuser.com
Natural Resources Council of Maine
EnvironmentMaine
Plum Creek Moosehead plan website
Plum Creek Merger Negotiations
RIDGE Records. 1923–2015. 9.31 cubic feet (9 boxes). At the Labor Archives of Washington, University of Washington Libraries Special Collections.

Companies formerly listed on the New York Stock Exchange
Defunct real estate companies of the United States
Real estate investment trusts of the United States
Pulp and paper companies of the United States
Defunct financial services companies of the United States
Defunct companies based in Seattle
Defunct forest products companies of the United States
Defunct pulp and paper companies
2016 mergers and acquisitions
Weyerhaeuser